Siddaganga Intercity Express, formerly Intercity Excpress is a daily express train that runs between Dharwad and Bengaluru in Karnataka, India and it replaced Bangalore City (KSR Bengaluru) - Hubli (Hubballi) Shatabdi Express. and until 2009, this train ran from Hubballi to Bengaluru. It was extended to Dharwad on 8 December 2009. It takes 8 hours 50 minutes to cover . It has 17 stops and 65 intermediate Stations.
It is numbered as 12725/12726. The train belongs to Mysuru Division of South Western Railway.

Stops
This train originates from Dharwad and goes through Hubli, Yalivigi, Haveri, Byadgi, Ranibennur, Harihar, Davangere, Chikjajur, Hosadurga Road, Ajjampura, Birur, Kadur, Arsikere, Tiptur, Tumakuru, Yeshwantpur and terminates at Bangalore City railway station.

Locomotive
This train is hauled by a WDP4D Locomotive of Hubballi Diesel Loco shed from South Western Railway.

Speed
The train reaches  between Yesvantpur and Tumakuru.

Rake and rake sharing
The train carries 21 coaches, including one air-conditioned coach. It shares its rake with Tippu Express and the Bangalore City– Talaguppa Intercity Express. It's maintenance happens at Mysuru.

Day 1 - 12613->20651
Day 2 - 20652->12725
Day 3 - 12726->12614

References

External links
 12725 Siddhaganga Intercity Express at India Rail Info
 12726 Siddhaganga Intercity Express at India Rail Info

Transport in Bangalore
Transport in Hubli-Dharwad
Rail transport in Dharwad
Rail transport in Karnataka
Intercity Express (Indian Railways) trains
Railway services introduced in 1997